Sun Come Up is a 2010 documentary film on the effect of global warming on the Carteret Islands. The film showed at the 2010 Full Frame Documentary Film Festival on April 8. It was named as a nominee for the Academy Award for Best Documentary (Short Subject) at the 83rd Academy Awards on January 25, 2011, but lost to Strangers No More.

References

External links
 
 Sun Come Up at New Day Films
 The Love Story Behind Oscar Nominee 'Sun Come Up' NPR, February 26, 2011

2010 films
American documentary films
2010 short documentary films
Documentary films about global warming
Films set in Papua New Guinea
Kickstarter-funded documentaries
2010s American films